Depledge is a surname. Notable people with the surname include: 

Alex Depledge, British technology entrepreneur
Joseph Depledge (1897–1974), English footballer
Robert Depledge (1882–1930), English footballer